Moyang was a Korean wife of Cho Kuang, who was chief retainer of Gaya confederacy. Queen Hogu, who was a wife of Mapum of Geumgwan Gaya was Moryang's granddaughter. In 48, when Heo Hwang-ok came over from Pandya dynasty in India to Gaya confederacy, Moryang came along as an attendant of Heo Hwang-ok, who married into Gaya confederacy.

Family 
 Husband: Cho Kuang
 Ggranddaughter: Queen Hogu

References 

Korean people of Indian descent
Gaya confederacy
Gaya confederacy people
Year of birth unknown
Year of death unknown